Silk is an American R&B group, formed in 1989 in Atlanta, Georgia. They are best known for their 1993 hit single, "Freak Me", which reached number-one on the US Billboard Hot 100.

Career
Silk is best known for their hit singles, "Freak Me", and "Happy Days" from their debut album, Lose Control. Another hit from Lose Control, "Girl U For Me", helped the album reach double platinum status.  They later had success with singles such as "I Can Go Deep", "Hooked on You", "Don't Rush", "If You" (released February 23, 1999) "Meeting in My Bedroom", and "We're Calling You".  In 1994, Silk won Album Of The Year for Lose Control at the Soul Train Music Awards.

Silk was discovered by the musician Keith Sweat. The group was originally a quintet made up of Timothy "Timzo" Cameron, James "Jimmy" Gates, Jr., Johnathen "John John" Rasboro, Tyga Graham & Albert Allen.  Gary "Big G" Glenn & Gary "Lil G" Jenkins joined shortly after the departures of Graham & Allen. In 2002, Silk left the label and took a hiatus. That same year, Jenkins went on to pursue other interests and made his stage debut in 2002 as 'AJ' in the Tyler Perry play Madea's Family Reunion. He resurfaced musically in 2007 with his solo debut, The Other Side. Silk and Sweat both appeared in the group, Black Men United on the song "U Will Know" which is featured on soundtrack for the movie Jason's Lyric. silk has also appeared on the soundtracks for Booty Call (Feel Good), Made In America (Does He Do It Good w/Keith Sweat),A Low Down Dirty Shame (I Can Go Deep), and Blankman (Cry On).

In 2003 and down to a quartet, Silk released their fifth studio album Silktime on their own label Silk Music Group. The album featured the songs "Silktime", "My Girl", "Alibi", "More", "You (The Baby Song)", "Check My Story" and a cover version of Blue Magic's "Sideshow". That song reunited them with their mentor Keith Sweat. The album appeared in the Billboard 200.

In 2006, the group returned with their sixth release, a covers album entitled Always And Forever on Shanachie Records. The album featured covers of R&B songs including "Adore" by Prince, "Always and Forever" by Heatwave, and "Secret Garden" by Quincy Jones. "Secret Garden" was the first and only single.

Jenkins has since reunited with Silk and their 7th album, Quiet Storm, was released on March 18, 2016 on Shanachie Records.

In 2018, Silk celebrated 25 years in the music business with two star studded concerts---one at B.B. King's in New York in February and the other in Atlanta in March.  They were also honored with an episode on the popular series Unsung that same year.

Members
 Gary Glenn - second tenor
 Johnathen Rasboro - tenor & lead
 Timothy Cameron - bass
 James "Jimmy" Gates, Jr. - baritone
 Gary Jenkins - lead & tenor

Former members
 Tyga Graham
 Albert Allen

Discography

Albums

Studio albums

Compilation albums

Singles

References

External links
Silk's official website
[ Silk] at AllMusic
Silk at Discogs

American contemporary R&B musical groups
African-American musical groups
American boy bands
Musicians from Atlanta
Musical groups from Georgia (U.S. state)
Musical groups established in 1989
New jack swing music groups
Elektra Records artists
Shanachie Records artists